Reginald Low Morrison (1932 – 2006) was a Scottish professional footballer who played as a goalkeeper.

Career
Born in Gourdon, Morrison played for Lewis United, Aberdeen, Dundee, Stirling Albion and Deveronvale.

He was capped at under-23 level by Scotland, playing a friendly away game against England at Hillsborough on 8 February 1956. This was to be his only cap for the national team.

Personal life
He died in Aberdeen on 28 November 2006.

References

1932 births
2006 deaths
Scottish footballers
Lewis United F.C. players
Aberdeen F.C. players
Dundee F.C. players
Stirling Albion F.C. players
Deveronvale F.C. players
Scottish Football League players
Association football goalkeepers
Scotland under-23 international footballers